Daniellia oblonga is a species of plant in the family Fabaceae. It is found in Benin, Cameroon, Equatorial Guinea, and Nigeria. It is threatened by habitat loss.

References

Detarioideae
Flora of West Tropical Africa
Vulnerable plants
Taxonomy articles created by Polbot
Taxa named by Daniel Oliver